Ectendomeliola is a genus of fungi in the family Meliolaceae.

References

External links 

Index Fungorum

Fungal plant pathogens and diseases
Meliolales
Sordariomycetes genera